Sveinn may refer to:

Sveinn Björnsson (1881–1952), the first president of the Republic of Iceland
Sveinn Einarsson (born 1934), best known for championing and cultivating professional theatre in Iceland
Sveinn Hákonarson (died 1016), earl of the house of Hlaðir and co-ruler of Norway from 1000 to c. 1015
Sveinn Pálsson, Icelandic physician and a naturalist who carried out systematic observations of Icelandic glaciers in the 1790s
Sveinn Rúnar Sigurðsson (born 1976), Icelandic composer music in styles ranging from modern classics to pop
Sveinn Thorvaldson (1872–1950), politician in Manitoba, Canada

See also
Svein
Sven
Sweyn

Masculine given names
Icelandic masculine given names